Helena Valley is the name of a river valley and a locality in the foothills of the Darling Scarp in Perth, Western Australia.

Geology
The river valley is the centre of the catchment of the Helena River and extends from the edge of the Darling Scarp where Boya, Gooseberry Hill and Helena Valley define the "mouth" of the valley that opens to the Swan Coastal Plain, east and south east past Mundaring Weir and Lake C.Y. O'Connor to its origins in the region of Mount Dale.

The soils of Helena Valley are characteristic of the eastern Swan Coastal Plain, ranging from sand to loam and clay, with a neutral pH tending towards moderately acid.

Locality
The locality is within the Shire of Mundaring, situated just south west of Boya and Greenmount Hill, 5 kilometres from Midland. It consists of many rural houses, but also contains six estates, and a shopping centre located in one of the estates. Helena Valley Primary School is located at the base of Greenmount Hill.

Early settlers
 James Drummond, noted botanist, after whom the street Drummond Gardens is named

Notes

References

External links
 Helena Valley on Geoscience Australia
 REIWA suburb profile for Helena Valley

Suburbs and localities in the Shire of Mundaring
Suburbs of Perth, Western Australia
Helena River